Aalayam Productions was an Indian film production and distribution company headed by S. Sriram. The firm had been a leading production studio in the Tamil film industry in the 1990s, with director Mani Ratnam also being a partner.

History 
S. Sriram and Mani Ratnam set up Aalayam Productions in 1990 and produced K. Subash's Chatriyan (1990) as their first venture. Featuring Vijayakanth and Bhanupriya in the lead roles, the film won critical acclaim and performed well at the box office.

Following the release of Roja (1992), director Mani Ratnam opted to stop making films for external production houses and chose to work solely for Aalayam Productions. The pair collaborated on Mani Ratnam's films including the heist comedy Thiruda Thiruda (1993) and the romantic drama Bombay (1995). As Bombay had faced political trouble prior to release, Sriram had said that he hoped that the film's plight and clearance would make it easier for future filmmakers to make films on religious riots without leading to controversy. Bombay went on to become one of the highest-grossing films from the Tamil industry and was also screened at many international film festivals. The studio also produced Vasanth's Aasai (1995), which gave actor Ajith Kumar his career breakthrough in the Tamil film industry.

Mani Ratnam later left the production house in the mid-1990s to prioritise work on his own studio, Madras Talkies.

Sriram died following a heart attack on 4 September 2019. Sriram was survived by his wife Nalini Sriram, a costume designer in the Indian film industry, and son, Nikhil Sriram.

Filmography

References 

Film distributors of India
Film production companies based in Chennai
Indian film studios
1990 establishments in Tamil Nadu
Indian companies established in 1990
Mass media companies established in 1990